A state health agency (SHA), or state department of health, is a department or agency of the state governments of the United States focused on public health. The state secretary of health is a constitutional or at times a statutory official in several states of the United States. The position is the chief executive official for the state's state health agency (or equivalent), chief administrative officer for the state's Board of Health (or equivalent), or both.

Following passage of the Safe Drinking Water Act of 1974, during the first ten years of the program the state health departments were given new and important roles under the law. Due to new grants available, they had enhanced their programs and had many more resources to oversee and help utilities come into compliance with drinking water standards, and they were able to develop other related activities like the capacity for doing risk assessments on new contaminants of concern.

Terminology 

Although the vast majority of these agencies are officially called "departments," the Association of State and Territorial Health Officials adopted "state health agency" as the generic term to reflect the fact that a substantial number of these agencies are no longer state "departments" in the traditional sense of a cabinet-level organizational unit dedicated exclusively to public health. During the 1950s, 1960s, and 1970s, at least 20 states and the District of Columbia merged these departments with other government agencies that provide social services, welfare, or other types of unrelated services.  The result is that in those jurisdictions, the state government agency that actually provides public health services is but one of several units inside a large cabinet-level agency.

Responsibilities 
State health departments have different names and responsibilities; in some states they are top-level administrative agencies, while in other states they are a division or bureau of another office. Health departments are usually responsible for public health, including preventive medicine, epidemiology, vaccinations, environmental health (sometimes including health inspections), and the licensing of health care professionals; the collection and archiving of vital records such as birth and death certificates and sometimes marriage and divorce certificates; health statistics; developmental disabilities; mental health; occupational safety and health; receiving and recording reports of notifiable diseases; and tobacco control.

In some states, state health departments may additionally be responsible for social services and welfare, environmental protection/pollution control, or the operation of the state psychiatric hospital. Some states have a Surgeon General.

State health agencies (SHAs)
The following are state health agencies as identified by the Centers for Disease Control and Prevention:

Further reading
EPA Alumni Association: Drinking Water, Half Century of Progress – a brief history of U.S. efforts to protect drinking water

See also 

 Health departments in the United States
 State education agency
 Health care in the United States
 United States Department of Health and Human Services
 Centers for Disease Control and Prevention

References

External links 
 StatePublicHealth.org - "State public health information and analysis."
 hss.alaska.gov - "Alaska Department of Health and Social Services"
 Rutgers University 12 Week Environment and Public Health course - "Rutgers University 12 Week Environment and Public Health Course prepares students for public health agency careers"

 
Public health organizations
State agencies of the United States